Christopoulos is a Greek surname. Notable people with the surname include:

Anastasios Christopoulos (1805-1887), Greek revolutionary leader 
Athanasios Christopoulos, Greek poet
Dimitrios Christopoulos, Greek athlete
George Christopoulos, Australian association football player
Giannis Christopoulos (born 1972), Greek association football coach
Spyros Christopoulos, Greek footballer
Stephanos Christopoulos, Greek wrestler
Vasileios Christopoulos, Greek writer
Yannis Christopoulos, Greek basketball coach

Greek-language surnames
Surnames
el:Χριστόπουλος